The 1968–69 Regionalliga  was the sixth season of the Regionalliga, the second tier of the German football league system. The league operated in five regional divisions, Berlin, North, South, Southwest and West. The five league champions and all five runners-up, at the end of the season, entered a promotion play-off to determine the two clubs to move up to the Bundesliga for the next season. The two promotion spots went to the Regionalliga West champions and runners-up Rot-Weiß Oberhausen and Rot-Weiß Essen.

Regionalliga Nord									
The 1968–69 season saw two new clubs in the league, Heider SV and TuS Celle, both promoted from the Amateurliga, while no club had been relegated from the Bundesliga to the league.

Regionalliga Berlin									
The 1968–69 season saw three new clubs in the league, Meteor 06 Berlin, VfL Nord Berlin and SC Staaken, all three promoted from the Amateurliga, while no club had been relegated from the Bundesliga to the league. For the following season the league was reduced from 16 to 14 clubs.

Regionalliga West									
The 1968–69 season saw two new clubs in the league, Bonner SC and Eintracht Duisburg, both promoted from the Amateurliga, while no club had been relegated from the Bundesliga to the league.

Regionalliga Südwest									
The 1968–69 season saw three new clubs in the league, FV Speyer and FC Landsweiler, both promoted from the Amateurliga, while Borussia Neunkirchen had been relegated from the Bundesliga to the league.

Regionalliga Süd									
The 1968–69 season saw four new clubs in the league, VfL Neckarau, ESV Ingolstadt and Rot-Weiß Frankfurt, both promoted from the Amateurliga, while Karlsruher SC had been relegated from the Bundesliga to the league.

Bundesliga promotion round

Group 1

Group 2

References

Sources
 30 Jahre Bundesliga  30th anniversary special, publisher: kicker Sportmagazin, published: 1993
 kicker-Almanach 1990  Yearbook of German football, publisher: kicker Sportmagazin, published: 1989, 
 DSFS Liga-Chronik seit 1945  publisher: DSFS, published: 2005

External links
Regionalliga on the official DFB website 
kicker 
Das Deutsche Fussball Archiv  Historic German league tables

1968-69
2
Ger